Anto Grabo (born 7 December 1960) is a Yugoslavian-born Hong Kong professional footballer of Croatian descent who played as a midfielder and spent most of his career in Hong Kong. He is currently the assistant coach of Hong Kong Premier League club HKFC.

He played with Željezničar Sarajevo, Dinamo Vinkovci, Rudar Ljubija and RFK Novi Sad in Yugoslavia.

References

External links
 www.GoalGoalGoal.com 請介紹一下南華基堡資料 (in chinese)
 Stats from Yugoslav Leagues at Zerodic.com. (As Anton Grabo)

1960 births
Living people
People from Travnik
Croats of Bosnia and Herzegovina
Hong Kong people of Croatian descent
Bosnia and Herzegovina emigrants to Hong Kong
Naturalized footballers of Hong Kong
Association football midfielders
Yugoslav footballers
Bosnia and Herzegovina footballers
Hong Kong footballers
Hong Kong international footballers
FK Željezničar Sarajevo players
HNK Cibalia players
FK Rudar Prijedor players
RFK Novi Sad 1921 players
K.F.C. Lommel S.K. players
Kuala Lumpur City F.C. players
South China AA players
Sun Hei SC players
Sing Tao SC players
Double Flower FA players
Hong Kong FC players
Yugoslav First League players
Belgian Pro League players
Malaysia Super League players
Hong Kong First Division League players
Yugoslav expatriate footballers
Expatriate footballers in Belgium
Yugoslav expatriate sportspeople in Belgium
Expatriate footballers in Malaysia
Yugoslav expatriate sportspeople in Malaysia
Bosnia and Herzegovina expatriate footballers
Expatriate footballers in Hong Kong
Bosnia and Herzegovina expatriate sportspeople in Hong Kong
Association football coaches